The Involutinidae are a family of foraminifera included in the Involutinida, characterized by calcareous tests consisting of an undivided planispirally to trochospirally coiled tubular second chamber wound around  the initial proloculus, and which may have thickenings or nodes on one or both sides. 
This family includes four subfamilies, Aulotortinae, Involutininae, Triadodiscinae, and 
Triasininae.

The Involutinidae were previously included in the Treatise on Invertebrate Paleontology Part C, 1964.

References

Spirillinata
Foraminifera families
Prehistoric SAR supergroup families